Adriano Tomás Custódio Mendes (born 28 November 1961) is a former professional footballer who played as a midfielder. Born in Cape Verde, Mendes held Portuguese nationality. He emigrated to Argentina before Cape Verde became independent from Portugal, and became a naturalized Argentine citizen. He played for clubs in Argentina, Chile, Bolivia, El Salvador, Honduras, Paraguay and Venezuela.

References

External links
 
 
 

1961 births
Living people
Sportspeople from Praia
Footballers from Santiago, Cape Verde
Portuguese footballers
Cape Verdean footballers
Portuguese expatriate footballers
Cape Verdean expatriate footballers
Cape Verdean emigrants to Argentina
Portuguese emigrants to Argentina
Naturalized citizens of Argentina
Estudiantes de La Plata footballers
Club Atlético Temperley footballers
Club Blooming players
Cerro Porteño players
Club Atlético Colón footballers
San Martín de Tucumán footballers
Santiago Wanderers footballers
Deportes Iquique footballers
Deportivo Táchira F.C. players
Chacarita Juniors footballers
Rampla Juniors players
Danubio F.C. players
C.A. Bella Vista players
Argentine Primera División players
Chilean Primera División players
Expatriate footballers in Chile
Expatriate footballers in Bolivia
Expatriate footballers in El Salvador
Expatriate footballers in Honduras
Expatriate footballers in Paraguay
Expatriate footballers in Venezuela
Association football midfielders